Hojjatabad (also Romanized as Ḩojjatābād; also known as Hojjat Abad Soflá, ’ojjatābād, and ’ojjatābād-e Soflā) is a village in Garizat Rural District, Nir District, Taft County, Yazd Province, Iran. At the 2006 census, its population was 270, in 68 families.

References 

Populated places in Taft County